Favell is a surname and may refer to:

Anthony Favell MBE (born 1939), Conservative Member of Parliament for Stockport
Doug Favell (born 1945), retired Canadian professional ice hockey goaltender
Henry Favell (1845–1896), Anglican priest
Les Favell (1929–1987), Australian cricketer

See also
Favell Lee Mortimer (1802–1878), English Evangelical author of educational books for children
Weston Favell, former village in the English town of Northampton, Northamptonshire
Weston Favell Academy for pupils aged 11 to 18
Flavell
Flavelle